Tricolia algoidea is a species of sea snail, a marine gastropod mollusk in the family Phasianellidae.

Description
The shell grows to a height of 1.5 mm.

Distribution
This species occurs in the Eastern Atlantic Ocean and in the Mediterranean Sea off Morocco

References

  Gofas S. (1982). The genus Tricolia in the Eastern Atlantic and the Mediterranean. Journal of Molluscan Studies 48: 182-213 [

External links
 
 Pallary, P. (1920). Exploration scientifique du Maroc organisée par la Société de Géographie de Paris et continuée par la Société des Sciences Naturelles du Maroc. Deuxième fascicule. Malacologie. i>Larose, Rabat et Paris pp. 108. 1(1): map
 Gofas, S.; Le Renard, J.; Bouchet, P. (2001). Mollusca. in: Costello, M.J. et al. (eds), European Register of Marine Species: a check-list of the marine species in Europe and a bibliography of guides to their identification. Patrimoines Naturels. 50: 180-213.

Phasianellidae
Gastropods described in 1920